Maculauger kokiy is a species of sea snail, a marine gastropod mollusk in the family Terebridae, the auger snails.

Description
The length of the shell attains 36 mm.

Distribution
This species occurs in the Indian Ocean off Réunion and Papua New Guinea.

References

 Pacaud J.M. & Lesport J.F. (2020). Maculauger kokiy nom. nov., un nom de remplacement pour Terebra pseudopertusa Bratcher & Cernohorsky, 1985 non Peyrot, 1931 (Mollusca : Gastropoda). Xenophora Taxonomy. 29: 12

External links
 Fedosov, A. E.; Malcolm, G.; Terryn, Y.; Gorson, J.; Modica, M. V.; Holford, M.; Puillandre, N. (2020). Phylogenetic classification of the family Terebridae (Neogastropoda: Conoidea). Journal of Molluscan Studies
  Bratcher T. & Cernohorsky W.O. (1985). Three new deep-water Indo-Pacific and one intertidal Brazilian species of Terebra (Gastropoda). The Nautilus. 99(4): 91–94
 MNHN? Paris: holotype

Terebridae
Gastropods described in 1985